Hjelm may refer to:

People
 Ari-Juhani Hjelm (b. 1962), Finnish football coach and former player
 Claus Winter Hjelm (1797 - 1871), Norwegian judge
 Jonne Hjelm (b. 1988), Finnish footballer
 Keve Hjelm (1922 – 2004), Swedish actor and film director
 Lena Hjelm-Wallén (b. 1943), Swedish Social Democratic politician
 Peter Jacob Hjelm (1746 - 1813), Swedish chemist
 Titus Hjelm (b. 1974), Finnish academic and musician

Places
 Hjelm (island), Danish island